George William Greenfield (4 August 1908 – 1981) was a professional footballer who played for Lee Bridge Gasworks and Tottenham Hotspur.

Football career 
The inside left began his playing career at Lea Bridge Gasworks. In 1931 he joined Tottenham Hotspur where he featured in 31 matches and scored 11 goals between 1931 and 1934.

References 

1908 births
1981 deaths
Footballers from Hackney, London
English footballers
English Football League players
Tottenham Hotspur F.C. players
Association football forwards